Trichopterigia kishidai is a species of moth of the family Geometridae first described by Yazaki in 1987. It is found in Taiwan.

References

Moths described in 1987
Larentiinae